Bupleurum falcatum, also known as sickle-leaved hare's-ear, Chinese thoroughwax, sickle hare's ear and sickle-leaf hare's ear, is a species of flowering plant in the family Apiaceae.

It is endemic to Europe and Western Asia.

Bupleurum falcatum has been used in Chinese medicine for over 2,000 years as a "liver tonic".

Bupleurum falcatum has been found to possess antidepressant properties, mediated through the serotonergic & noradrenergic systems (although the precise mechanism remains to be found).

References

falcatum
Plants described in 1753
Taxa named by Carl Linnaeus